Sir Michael George Parke Stoker CBE FRS FRSE MD FRCP (4 July 1918 – 13 August 2013) was a British physician and medical researcher in virology.

Scientific career
Stoker studied medicine at Clare College, Cambridge and St Thomas' Hospital in London, gaining his MD in 1947, after serving in the Royal Army Medical Corps during World War II. On return to civilian life he became a Fellow of Clare College from 1948 and an assistant tutor and director of medical studies from 1949 to 1958. Between 1953 and 1956, he researched the structure of Coxiella burnetii, the bacteria causing Q fever, with Paul Fiset. 

Stoker moved to Glasgow University in 1958. There he was the first professor of virology at the university (the first chair of virology to be established at a British university) from 1958 to 1968 and was appointed honorary director of the Medical Research Council Unit in 1959. He was the director of Imperial Cancer Research Fund Laboratories from 1968 to 1979 and president of Clare Hall, Cambridge University 1980–87.

He was elected a Fellow of the Royal Society in 1968 and delivered their Leeuwenhoek Lecture in 1971. He was made a CBE in 1974 and was knighted in 1980.

Personal life
Stoker was born in Taunton, UK. His father, born in Ireland, was a medical doctor. He attended Oakham School and then medicine at University of Cambridge.  At the outbreak of the Second World War he was in training at St Thomas's Hospital, London. He enlisted in the Royal Army Medical Corps and was sent to India.  He worked in Lucknow, Hydrabad and finally Pune. In Pune, he became involved in studying typhus and bush typhus which led to his life-long work in virology, since at the time it was thought that the Rickettsia that caused these diseases were a type of virus. In 1947 he returned to civilian life.

Marriage
He married Veronica English (died 2004) in 1942, whom he met as a fellow student at University of Cambridge; the couple had 5 children.

References

Biography of Michael Stoker

1918 births
2013 deaths
Fellows of Clare College, Cambridge
Fellows of Clare Hall, Cambridge
Alumni of Clare College, Cambridge
Academics of the University of Glasgow
British Army personnel of World War II
Commanders of the Order of the British Empire
Fellows of the Royal Society
Knights Bachelor
Royal Army Medical Corps officers
British virologists
Presidents of Clare Hall, Cambridge